Southern Cross Airport  is a public-use airport located  southwest of the central business district of the Williamstown section of Monroe Township, Gloucester County, New Jersey, United States. It is privately owned.

References

External links

Airports in New Jersey
Monroe Township, Gloucester County, New Jersey
Transportation buildings and structures in Gloucester County, New Jersey